Günter Drews (born 9 July 1967) is a retired German football player.

References

External links
 

German footballers
Germany under-21 international footballers
Bundesliga players
Bayer 04 Leverkusen players
Hannover 96 players
1. FC Nürnberg players
AC Bellinzona players
SpVgg Greuther Fürth players
1967 births
Living people
Association football midfielders